Roger Pilkington (1928 — 1969)  was a collector of Chinese ceramics and a member of the Pilkington glass-making family.

References

English farmers
People educated at Eton College
1969 deaths
Roger